Bachanlu (also Romanized as Bachanlū) is a village in Solduz Rural District, in the Central District of Naqadeh County, West Azerbaijan Province, Iran. At the 2006 census, its population was 21, in 4 families.

References 

Populated places in Naqadeh County